Jalan Kampung Seberang (Pahang state route C123) is a major road in Pahang, Malaysia.

List of junctions

Roads in Pahang